The Italic League or Most Holy League was an international agreement concluded in Venice on 30 August 1454, between the Papal States, the Republic of Venice, the Duchy of Milan, the Republic of Florence, and the Kingdom of Naples, following the Treaty of Lodi a few months previously. The next forty years were marked by peace and economic expansion based on a balance of power within Italy. The decline of the League brought about the Italian Wars.

Background 

Solemnly proclaimed on the 2 March 1455 with the accession of Pope Nicholas V (1447–55), king Alfonso and other small states to the League (excluding Malatestine Rimini, at Alfonso's insistence), by it was established a mutual defence agreement and a 25-year truce between the Italian powers, forbidding separate alliances and treaties while committing to maintenance of the established boundaries. After the period of confrontation, the Italian states acknowledged the  Francesco Sforza as successor to the last of the Visconti of Milan, after having married the only daughter of Filippo Maria Visconti. The relative peace and stability resulting from Lodi and the League, promoted by Sforza, allowed him to consolidate his rule over Milan and it was Cosimo de' Medici's most important foreign policy decision to end the traditional rivalry between his Florence and Sforza's Milan.

Consequences 
The League was the coherent development of the Peace of Lodi, born from the realisation that none of the regional Italian states, despite the long and bloody wars in the preceding hundred years, was in a position to assume hegemony in the north, let alone in the peninsula. The League therefore provided a détente, founded on mutual suspicion and fear of France rather than on collaboration, which might have led to the formation of a broader, unified state.

The Italic League played an essential part in the balance of power subsequently pursued by the Florentine ruler Lorenzo de' Medici (1449–92); its only cracks were the Pazzi conspiracy, the Barons' conspiracy, and the Salt War. The League provided enough stability to allow the peninsular economy to recover from the population loss and economic depression caused by the Black Death and its aftermath, leading to an economic expansion that endured until the first part of the 17th century.

With the death of Lorenzo de' Medici in 1492 was marked the decline of the League, he having been one of its greatest supporters and prime maintainer, recognising the advantage of maintaining a balance among the five powers as opposed to trying to eliminate his enemies. Whilst the League failed to prevent the French invasion in 1494 that began the Italian Wars, it did enable (as the League of Venice) the creation of the army that repelled Charles VIII's army after their sack of Naples. The League army engaged the French at Fornovo and retained control of the battlefield but failed to prevent an orderly French retreat. The Venetian alliance with France and Spain against Milan and Naples in the Italian War of 1499–1504, however, sounded the death knell for the League.

As a result of the détente, unlike France, Spain and England, Italy did not coalesce into a single monarchy in the Middle Ages, and was consequently left vulnerable to invasion from more powerful neighbours. Several factors have been considered causes of this; Francesco Guicciardini blamed particularism, for example, while Niccolò Machiavelli believed it resulted from the moral and civil decay of institutions and morals and in Papal policy, for centuries aimed at avoiding the formation of a unified Italy. It should be borne in mind, however, that Machiavelli's great work The Prince was a reflection of the political equilibrium resulting from the League's existence.

See also 
 Wars in Lombardy
 Treaty of Lodi
 League of Venice
 Italian Wars
 Duchy of Milan
 Republic of Florence
 Republic of Venice

References 

1454 establishments in Europe
15th-century military alliances
Treaties of the Republic of Venice
Treaties of the Republic of Florence
Treaties of the Duchy of Milan
15th century in the Republic of Florence
15th century in the Republic of Venice
15th century in the Kingdom of Naples
15th century in the Papal States